Ralph E. "Horse" Chase (December 19, 1902 – October 24, 1989) was an American football tackle who played one season in the National Football League (NFL) with the Hammond Pros and Akron Indians. Chase played college football at the University of Pittsburgh and attended Wyoming Seminary in Kingston, Pennsylvania.  He was a consensus All-American in 1925.

College career
Chase was a three-year letterman for the Pittsburgh Panthers football team.  He was recognized as a consensus first-team All-American at the tackle position following the 1925 season.

Professional career
Chase appeared in four games for the Akron Indians and one game for the Hammond Pros during the  NFL season.

Coaching career
Chase was a coach for several organizations, including Ursinus College, Bernardsville High School, Drexel and Muhlenberg College.

References

External links
 Just Sports Stats

1902 births
1989 deaths
All-American college football players
American football tackles
Akron Indians players
Basketball coaches from Pennsylvania
Drexel Dragons football coaches
Drexel Dragons men's basketball coaches
Hammond Pros players
Pittsburgh Panthers football players
Players of American football from Pennsylvania
Wyoming Seminary alumni